The men's field hockey tournament at the 2011 Pan American Games was held in Guadalajara, Mexico at the Pan American Hockey Stadium from October 20–29.

Argentina won their eighth gold medal by defeating the defending champions Canada 3–1 in the final. Chile won the bronze medal by defeating Cuba 4–3.

Qualification
A National Olympic Committee may enter one men's team for the field hockey competition. Mexico, the host nation along with seven other countries qualified through regional competitions.

Cuba played a three match series against the men's country that would have qualified as the eighth country (Brazil, who finished in the third qualifying position from the 2009 Pan American Cup), as Cuba did not enter the Central American and Caribbean Games.

Pools
Pools were based on the current world rankings (January 4, 2011). Teams ranked 1, 4, 5 and 8 would be in Pool A, while teams ranked 2, 3, 6 and 7 would be in Pool B.

Umpires
Twelve officials were appointed by Pan American Hockey Federation to officiate matches.

John Wright (RSA)
Lim Hong Zhen (SIN)
Diego Barbas (ARG)
Jamar Springer (BAR)
Chris Wilson (CAN)
Martín Vatter (CHI)
Daniel López Ramos (URU)
Arturo Vázquez Serrano (MEX)
Grant Hundley (USA)
Constantine Soteriades (USA)
Maximiliano Scala (ARG)
Devin Hooper (GUY)

Competition format
Eight teams competed in both the men's and women's Pan American Games hockey tournaments with the competition consisting of two rounds.
In the first round, teams were divided into two pools of four teams, and play followed round robin format with each of the teams playing all other teams in the pool once.  Teams were awarded three points for a win, one point for a draw and zero points for a loss.

Following the completion of the pool games, teams placing first and second in each pool advanced to a single elimination round consisting of two semifinal games, and the bronze and gold medal games. Remaining teams competed in classification matches to determine their ranking in the tournament. During these matches, extra time of 7½ minutes per half was played if teams were tied at the end of regulation time. During extra time, play followed golden goal rules with the first team to score declared the winner. If no goals were scored during extra time, a penalty stroke competition took place.

Results
All times are Central Daylight Time (UTC−5)

Preliminary round

Pool A

Pool B

Fifth to eighth place classification

5–8th place semi-finals

Seventh and eighth place

Fifth and sixth place

Medal round

Semi-finals

Bronze medal match

Gold medal match

Final standings

Medalists

References

Men
Pan American Games
2011